Searching for Sugar Man is the 2012 soundtrack album from the documentary, Searching for Sugar Man, containing a compilation of songs by Rodriguez from his two studio albums. As a result of the popularity of the documentary, the album climbed high for a soundtrack album in some national album charts. In Sweden, it reached #3 in early 2013 when the Academy Award nomination was announced, and had been in the charts for 26 weeks by the time it received the award in February 2013; in Denmark it reached #18; and in New Zealand it reached #9.  The album was released by Light in the Attic / Legacy records.  All tracks were remastered by Dave Cooley of Elysian Masters.

Track listing
 "Sugar Man" (3:50)
 "Crucify Your Mind" (2:32)
 "Cause" (5:29)
 "I Wonder" (2:34)
 "Like Janis" (2:37)
 "This Is Not a Song, It's an Outburst: Or, the Establishment Blues" (2:07)
 "Can't Get Away" (3:56)
 "I Think of You" (3:26)
 "Inner City Blues" (3:27)
 "Sandrevan Lullaby – Lifestyles" (6:39)
 "Street Boy" (3:47)
 "A Most Disgusting Song" (4:48)
 "I'll Slip Away" (2:51)
 "Jane S. Piddy" (3:00)

Notes
 Tracks 1, 2, 4, 5, 6, 9 and 14 are taken from the album Cold Fact
 Tracks 3, 8, 10 and 12 are from the album Coming from Reality
 Tracks 7, 11 and 13 were recorded for Rodriguez' unfinished third album and were later included as bonus tracks on the Coming from Reality 2009 US re-issue

In anticipation of possible customer questions raised by the film as to whether Rodriguez is properly compensated for this album, the back cover has the statement, "Rodriguez receives royalties from the sale of this release."

Charts

Weekly charts

Year-end charts

Certifications

References

2012 soundtrack albums
Light in the Attic Records compilation albums
Documentary film soundtracks